Lasiodiscus, commonly known as red-hair bushes, is a small plant genus in the family Rhamnaceae. It is endemic to Africa and its adjacent islands.

Description
The small trees have opposite, often asymmetric leaves. As with Colubrina, the flower ovaries are surrounded by a nectariferous disc that fills the receptacle.

Habitat
They regularly occur in the understorey of tropical forests, or alternatively in swamp forest. One species, L. rozeirae, is limited to mountain forest understorey.

Relationships
Lasiodiscus is morphologically similar to Colubrina, which occurs in the Neotropics, Asia and Afrotropics, but preliminary molecular analysis failed to group them as nearest relatives.

Species
There are 9 accepted species:
 Lasiodiscus chevalieri Hutch. – 
 Lasiodiscus fasciculiflorus Engl. – Sierra Leone to Nigeria, w Cameroon and D.R.C.
 Lasiodiscus holtzii Engl. – East Africa
 Lasiodiscus mannii Hook. – central Africa
 Lasiodiscus marmoratus C.H. Wright – Cameroon
 Lasiodiscus mildbraedii Engl. – African tropics and locally along east coast to South Africa
 Lasiodiscus pervillei Baill. – Africa, Madagascar, Mauritius, Réunion and Comores
 L. p. pervillei – widespread in Madagascar
 L. p. ferrugineus (Verdc.) Figueiredo – local and vulnerable in East Africa
 Lasiodiscus rozeirae A.W. Exell – São Tomé in Gulf of Guinea, vulnerable
 Lasiodiscus usambarensis Engl. – Usambara Mountains and locally to Zimbabwe

References

External links
 Flora of Zimbabwe
 Madagascar Catalogue
 Description of L. pervillei

Note: The Lasiodiscidae belongs to the Foraminifera and Reichel (1945) described the genus Lasiodiscus.

 
Rhamnaceae genera